Christina Bonde is a Danish former football midfielder. She played mostly for Fortuna Hjørring in the Elitedivisionen.

Born in Copenhagen, Bonde was a member of the Danish national team. With the national team she took part in the 1995 World Cup, the 1996 Summer Olympics and the 2001 European Championship,

References

External links
 

1973 births
Living people
Danish women's footballers
1995 FIFA Women's World Cup players
Footballers at the 1996 Summer Olympics
Olympic footballers of Denmark
Denmark women's international footballers
Footballers from Copenhagen
Women's association football midfielders